Mohamad Omar Hemidi (born 1 May 1986 in Aleppo, Syria) is a Syrian footballer who plays as a defender for Al-Jaish, which competes in the Syrian Premier League the top division in Syria and is currently a member of the Syria national football team.

Career

Club career
Hemidi's career began in the youth system of Al-Ittihad before starting his professional career with the senior team. He helped the club reach the final of the AFC Cup the second most important association cup in Asia. Al-Ittihad won the final against Kuwaiti Premier League champions Al-Qadsia after penalties. The game was tied 1–1 after regular time and Extra Time.

International career
Hemidi has been a regular for the Syria national football team since 2007. He made 9 appearances for Syria during the qualifying rounds of the 2010 FIFA World Cup.

International goals
Scores and results table. Syria's goal tally first:

Honour and Titles

Club
Al-Ittihad
 Syrian Premier League: 2005
 Syrian Cup: 2005, 2006, 2011 
 AFC Cup: 2010

References

External links
 

1986 births
Living people
Sportspeople from Aleppo
Syrian footballers
Association football defenders
Syria international footballers
Al-Ittihad Aleppo players
Footballers at the 2006 Asian Games
Asian Games competitors for Syria
AFC Cup winning players
Syrian Premier League players
21st-century Syrian people